Roast lamb with laver sauce is a recipe associated with Wales and Welsh cuisine.

Lamb and mutton dishes are traditional throughout Wales with all regions having their own variations, and the various sheep breeds make lamb dishes worthy of being the national dish.

Mountain lamb is sweet,
Valley lamb is fatter,
I therefore deemed it meet
To carry off the latter! 
(Traditional Welsh ditty).

The meal is a contender for the national dish of Wales, and has a long tradition. "A capital dinner! You don't get moor mutton with laver sauce every day!" (Collins 1875). The dish was eaten by George Borrow and is mentioned in Wild Wales in 1856.

Salt marsh lamb from the River Towy is also popular in South Wales.

See also

 List of lamb dishes

References

External links 
Roast lamb with laverbread recipe
Wales the true taste website Wales food & drink awards info and recipes

Lamb, roast with laver sauce
Lamb dishes
National dishes